Khrystofor Antonovich Baranovsky (— 1941) was a financial expert and a leader of cooperative movement in the Russian Empire, Ukraine, and Brazil.

He was born in the village of Nemyryntsi, Berdychiv uyezd, in the Kiev Governorate of the Russian Empire (in present-day Ruzhyn, in the Zhytomyr Oblast of Ukraine). Baranovsky held the chair of the General Secretariat together with Volodymyr Vynnychenko (Secretary of Internal Affairs). He did not have any political affiliation. Baranovsky was born in a peasant family. He did not earn a general education, but his Financial Talent made him the leader of the Ukrainian cooperative movement. In December 1913, Baranovsky was admitted to the International Co-operative Alliance.

Prior to World War I he established the Soyuzbank in Kiev. In 1917 with Fedir Kryzhanivsky Baranovsky established the Ukrainbank and became its head director. Since 1919 he chaired the board of the Central Ukrainian cooperative union - Central. In 1920, Baranovsky emigrated to South America where he died some 20 years later.

References

External links
 General Secretariat at Encyclopedia of Ukraine
 Council of National Ministers at Encyclopedia of Ukraine
 Hai-Nyzhnyk, P. Baranovsky Khrystofor Antonovych. Encyclopedia of Modern Ukraine. Vol 2. "National Academy of Sciences of Ukraine". Kyiv 2003.

1874 births
1941 deaths
People from Zhytomyr Oblast
People from Berdichevsky Uyezd
Finance ministers of Ukraine
Members of the Central Council of Ukraine
Ukrainian cooperative organizers
Ukrainian politicians before 1991
Ukrainian bankers
Ukrainian emigrants to Brazil